The Lapworth 24, sometimes called an L24,  is an American trailerable sailboat that was designed by Bill Lapworth as a cruiser and first built in 1958.

The Lapworth 24 design was developed into the flush-deck Gladiator 24 in 1958. The Spartan 24 was developed from the same design as an economy model.

Production
The design was built by Continental Plastics in Costa Mesa, California, United States, starting in 1958, but is now out of production.

Design
The Lapworth 24 is a recreational keelboat, built predominantly of fiberglass, with wood trim. It has a fractional sloop rig, a spooned raked stem, an angled transom, a keel-mounted rudder controlled by a tiller and a fixed modified long keel, with a cut-away forefoot. It displaces  and carries  of lead ballast.

The boat is normally fitted with a small  outboard motor or inboard motor for docking and maneuvering.

The design has sleeping accommodation for four people, with a double "V"-berth in the bow cabin and a two straight settee quarter berths in the main cabin. The galley is located on the both sides just forward of the companionway ladder. The galley is equipped with a two-burner stove and a sink to starboard and an icebox to port. A navigation station is on the port side, on top of the ice box. The head is located centered in the bow cabin.

Operational history
Sixteen year old Robin Lee Graham sailed a used Lapworth 24, named Dove west from California in July 1965, reaching Saint Thomas, U.S. Virgin Islands in November 1968 before switching to a Luders 33 to complete the circumnavigation in 1970. His adventures became regular features in National Geographic Magazine and Graham later wrote a bestselling book about the voyage, entitled Dove.

In a 2010 review Steve Henkel wrote, "best features: The comparatively long deep keel on the L24 (and the Gladiator 24) versus her comp[etitor]s provides considerable directional stability (ie., ability to keep sailing in one direction without needing to correct the course using the helm or sail trim). Worst features: Like all her comps except one, the L24's draft is too deep for convenient trailer-sailing."

See also
List of sailing boat types

Related development
Gladiator 24

References

Keelboats
1950s sailboat type designs
Sailing yachts
Trailer sailers
Sailboat type designs by Bill Lapworth
Sailboat types built by Continental Plastics